"Roses Are Red (My Love)" is a popular song composed by Al Byron and Paul Evans. It was recorded by Bobby Vinton, backed by Robert Mersey and his Orchestra, in New York City in February 1962, and released in April 1962, and the song was his first hit.

Bobby Vinton version
Bobby Vinton found the song in a reject pile at Epic Records. He first recorded it as an R&B number, but was allowed to re-record it in a slower more dramatic arrangement, with strings and a vocal choir (from Robert Mersey and his Orchestra) added.

The song was released in April 1962.  It reached No. 1 in Australia, New Zealand, Norway, South Africa, and the United States, and was a major hit in many other countries as well. The song topped the Billboard Hot 100 singles chart on July 14, 1962, and remained there for four weeks. The single was also the first number-one hit for Epic Records.

Billboard ranked the record No. 4 in their year end ranking "Top 100 Singles of 1962" and No. 36 in their year end ranking of the top Rhythm and Blues records of 1962. The song was also ranked No. 17 on Cash Boxs "Top 100 Chart Hits of 1962".

Chart performance

Weekly charts

Year-end charts

All-time charts

Ronnie Carroll version
In the UK, a cover version by Northern Irish singer Ronnie Carroll reached No. 3 on the Record Retailer chart on August 8, 1962, the same week that the Bobby Vinton record peaked at No. 15. It peaked at No. 7 in the very first Irish Singles Chart published in September 1962.

Chart performance

Other versions
In July 1962, David MacBeth released his version of the song as a single on Piccadilly Records.

The song was recorded by Jim Reeves in 1963 and released on the album Gentleman Jim, one of the last albums released while he was still alive.

The song was covered by Singaporean female artist Zhuang Xue Fang (莊雪芳), in edited Standard Chinese lyrics written by Suyin (舒雲/雨牛) under title name of 玫瑰花香, with Ruby Records in 1967.

In 1962, an answer song, entitled "Long as the Rose Is Red", was recorded by Florraine Darlin. The song spent seven weeks on the Billboard Hot 100, reaching No. 62, while reaching No. 15 on Billboards Easy Listening chart. It was released by Epic Records (single #9529) and was also produced by Robert Morgan.

See also
List of Hot 100 number-one singles of 1962 (U.S.)
List of number-one adult contemporary singles of 1962 (U.S.)
VG-lista 1962
List of number-one singles in Australia during the 1960s
List of number-one singles in 1962 (New Zealand)

References

1962 singles
Bobby Vinton songs
Wednesday (band) songs
Billboard Hot 100 number-one singles
Cashbox number-one singles
Number-one singles in Australia
Number-one singles in New Zealand
Number-one singles in Norway
Number-one singles in South Africa
Songs written by Paul Evans (musician)
1962 songs
Epic Records singles